Herman Arthur Voaden,  FRSA (19 January 1903 – 27 June 1991) was a Canadian playwright.

Early life
Born in London, Ontario, he received a Bachelor of Arts (Honours) degree in 1923 and a Master of Arts degree in 1926 from Queen's University. He also studied at the University of Chicago and at Yale University.

His father, Dr. Arthur Voaden, pioneered vocational teaching in Ontario. His mother, Luisa Bale Voaden, was also a teacher. Voaden studied modern drama at Queen's University, 1920–1923, and wrote his 1926 Queen’s M.A. thesis on Eugene O’Neill.

Political activity
A member of the Co-operative Commonwealth Federation, he ran for the House of Commons of Canada in the western Toronto riding of Trinity in the 1945 elections, 1949 elections, 1953 elections, and a 1954 by-election. He lost each time.

Associations
Voaden was a member of Toronto's Arts and Letters Club,  the Dominion Drama Festival, and a founding member and first president of the Canadian Arts Council (which became the Canadian Conference of the Arts in 1958). As president of the CAC, he was one of several Canadian representatives to the first UNESCO conference, held in Paris in 1946.

Honours
In 1974, he was made a Member of the Order of Canada, Canada's highest civilian honor, "in recognition of his contribution to the performing arts as a playwright, producer and teacher, and his services in fostering support for all the arts and crafts". He was made a Fellow in the Royal Society of Arts in 1970.

Following his death, Queen's University created the Herman Voaden Playwriting Competition to honour new works by emerging playwrights.

Works

The White Kingdom - 1928
Northern Storm - 1929
Northern Song - 1930
Western Wolf - 1930
Fragment - 1931
Wilderness - 1931
Earth Song - 1932
Rocks - 1932
Hill-Land - 1934
Murder Pattern - 1936
Ascend As the Sun - 1942
Libretto for the opera, The Prodigal Son (music by Frederick Jacobi) - debuted 1945

References

External links
 Herman Arthur Voaden archives at the Clara Thomas Archives and Special Collections, York University Libraries, Toronto, Ontario

1903 births
1991 deaths
20th-century Canadian dramatists and playwrights
Writers from London, Ontario
Members of the Order of Canada
Queen's University at Kingston alumni
Canadian male dramatists and playwrights
20th-century Canadian male writers
Co-operative Commonwealth Federation candidates for the Canadian House of Commons